Janko Tipsarević was the defending champion but decided to participate at 2012 PTT Thailand Open instead.
Juan Mónaco won the title, beating Julien Benneteau 7–5, 4–6, 6–3 in the final.

Seeds

Draw

Finals

Top half

Bottom half

Qualifying

Seeds

Qualifiers

Lucky loser
  Sanam Singh

Draw

First qualifier

Second qualifier

Third qualifier

Fourth qualifier

References
 Main Draw
 Qualifying Draw

Proton Malaysian Open - Singles
2012 Singles